Pauline MacDonald (born 17 April 1975) is a Scottish football coach and former player who was appointed manager of the Scotland under-17 women's team in October 2017. As a player MacDonald made her senior Scotland debut in 1992, served the national team as captain and amassed a total of 65 caps. A versatile defender or midfielder, MacDonald played at club level in the American USL W-League and the English FA Women's Premier League, as well as in her native Scotland.

Playing career

Club career
MacDonald began playing organised football as an 11-year-old, with Central Fife L.F.C.. She moved to Cumbernauld United L.F.C., then to the dominant team of the era Cove Rangers L.F.C. who were based in Aberdeen. In 1998 MacDonald played for Miami Gliders of the USL W-League and was named to the second division all-star team.

English FA Women's Premier League club Arsenal signed MacDonald during the 1999–00 season.

After a period of retirement from playing, MacDonald signed for Edinburgh Ladies in September 2006.

International career
In May 1991 MacDonald captained the Scotland under-21 team to a 4–2 win over rivals England in Motherwell. She made her senior international debut in April 1992, at the Albena Cup.

Coaching career
In September 2004 MacDonald was appointed as a women's football development officer for Edinburgh, a position jointly funded by the Scottish Football Association (SFA) and the local authority. Structured female youth football was completely lacking in the area and MacDonald made it her priority to remedy the situation.

MacDonald guided Dalkeith L.F.C. to promotion into the top-flight Scottish Women's Premier League in 2007–2008, her first season as a club coach. They took their Premier League place as Boroughmuir Thistle, having undergone a name change.

After approximately a decade of working for the SFA as coach and assistant coach with the national women's youth teams, MacDonald was appointed coach of the Scotland under-17 women's team in October 2017. She joined her former Scotland teammates Shelley Kerr and Pauline Hamill as a full-time female coach on the SFA payroll.

References

External links

1975 births
Living people
Scottish women's footballers
Scotland women's international footballers
Arsenal W.F.C. players
FA Women's National League players
USL W-League (1995–2015) players
Female association football managers
Expatriate women's soccer players in the United States
Scottish expatriate women's footballers
Scottish expatriate sportspeople in the United States
Women's association football defenders
Women's association football midfielders
Spartans W.F.C. players
Women's association football managers
Scottish football managers